George Byrd (born March 22, 1926, in Anson County, North Carolina, United States;  died March 12, 2010, in Munich, Germany) was an American conductor. During the 1980s he performed mainly in Germany.

He is also known for his acting performance as the American soldier called Bill in Rainer Werner Fassbinder’s 1978 film The Marriage of Maria Braun.

American conductors (music)
American male conductors (music)
1926 births
2010 deaths